Sulikunte is a village located south-east of Bangalore, Karnataka, India. This village is in close proximity to Kodathi Grama Panchayath, and Bengaluru East Taluk.

Mahadevapura, Bangalore is the governing constituency for Sulikunte, which is represented by MLA-Sri Aravind Limbavali (Minister Of Forest, Kannada and Culture) and MP-PC Mohan of the Bengaluru Central Constituency.

Sulikunte is located near information technology cluster areas such as Whitefield (20 km from Sulikunte), Electronic City (12 km from Sulikunte), and Outer Ring Road (9 km from Sulikunte), as well as Marathahalli, Silk Board, and Koramangala.

List of schools in or near Sulikunte

Delhi Public School, Bangalore East
Sri Saraswathi Vidyanikethana School and PU College (2 km from Sulikunte)
Indus International School (3 km from Sulikunte)
Oakridge International School (3 km from Sulikunte)
Inventure Academy (3 km from Sulikunte)
Greenwood High (4 km from Sulikunte)
St. Patricks Academy (2 km from Sulikunte)
Head Start Educational Institute (5 km from Sulikunte)

 Bethany High School (4 km from Sulikunte)
 Ryan International Academy(Near DPS East)

Petroleum companies in Sulikunte
 Bharath Petroleum Corporation Limited
 Indian Oil Corporation Limited

Famous temples in Sulikunte
Channaraya Swami Temple
Maramma Devi Temple
Saplamma Devi Temple
Muneshvara Dwami Temple
Muttu Anjaneya Swami Temple
Om Shakti Devi Temple

References

Neighbourhoods in Bangalore